Konstanty Brandel (1880–1970) was a Polish painter and graphic artist. He is a notable contributor to the Young Poland movement.

He studied at the Académie Vitti in Paris.

References

External links
Works
Biography and Other Information
Biography and Images

19th-century Polish painters
19th-century Polish male artists
20th-century Polish painters
20th-century Polish male artists
1880 births
1970 deaths
Polish male painters